Héctor Virgilio Becerril Rodríguez (born December 28, 1957) is a Peruvian Fujimorist politician and pharmaceutical chemist. He was a congressman in the period 2011-2016 representing the department of Amazonas and in the period 2016-2019 representing the department of Lambayeque.

Biography 
He was born in Mílpuc, on December 28, 1957, the son of Wilfredo Becerril Vargas and Abilia Rodríguez Torres. His brother is former congressman Víctor Becerril Rodríguez.

He completed his primary and secondary studies in the city of Trujillo (department of La Libertad). In 1988 he obtained the title of pharmaceutical chemist at the National University of Trujillo. In 2005, he graduated from the Master in Food Sciences, studied at the Faculty of Pharmacy and Biochemistry of the National University of San Marcos.

Between 2000 and 2002 he was dean of the Pharmaceutical Chemical College of La Libertad. He has been a teacher at the Alas Peruanas University and at the IDAT Higher Institute.

Political career

Congressman 
In the 2011 general elections, he was elected Congressman under the Force 2011 where he obtained 14,946 preferential votes for the 2011-2016 parliamentary period.

In the 2016 general elections, he was re-elected Congressman once again, under  Popular Force, this time representing the department of Lambayeque, for the parliamentary period 2016-2021.

On September 30, 2019, after the dissolution of the Congress decreed by former President Martín Vizcarra, his parliamentary position came to an end.

Controversies

'' The Wachiturros of Tumán '' case 
In 2008, prosecutor Juan Carrasco reported that congressman Javier Velásquez Quesquén and Héctor Becerril had given political support to the criminal network known as "Los Wachiturros de Tumán." In April 2018, the weekly Hildebrandt referred to that an effective collaborator pointed out that Edwin Oviedo, an alleged member of Los Wachiturros de Tumán, had given money to Velásquez Quesquén and Marisol Espinoza.  In March 2019, the technician, Juan Carlos Oblitas, declared before the prosecutor Sandra Castro that he saw these parliamentarians during the Oviedo administration.

References 

1957 births
Living people
Members of the Congress of the Republic of Peru
Fujimorista politicians
People from Amazonas Region
National University of Trujillo alumni
21st-century Peruvian politicians